Hugh Reginald Patrick Thompson (born 11 April 1934) is a former English first-class cricketer. Thompson was a right-handed batsman who bowled right-arm off break.

Thompson made his first-class debut for Hampshire in 1953 against Oxford University. Thompson's second and final first-class match for Hampshire came in 1954, once again against Oxford University.

External links
Hugh Thompson at Cricinfo
Hugh Thompson at CricketArchive

1934 births
Living people
Cricketers from Scunthorpe
English cricketers
Hampshire cricketers